Idiospermum is a genus containing a single species of tree, Idiospermum australiense, found in Australian tropical rainforests. The species represents one of the earliest known lineages of flowering plants, dating back as far as 120 million years. It is found today only in the Daintree and Wet Tropics rainforests region of north-eastern Queensland. It is endemic to a very few locations in north-eastern Queensland (e.g. in Daintree National Park), in the very wet lowland parts of the forest, in groups of 10–100 trees together (rather than scattered individuals). Common names include ribbonwood and idiot fruit.

Description
The flowers measure  in diameter, with all floral organs spirally arranged. The tepals are initially creamy white when the flower opens, then turn red as the flower ages. The "fruits" have very distinctive features and do not fit within the definition of true fruits as such: all the protective layers decay while still on the parent tree and each one released is an extremely large ( diameter) naked plant embryo. This is one of the  largest embryos of any flowering plant. It is very toxic, inducing symptoms in cattle similar to those of strychnine poisoning.

Reproductive organs
Plants have both male and female sex organs, but half of the flowers of the ribbonwood do not produce any fertile female organs. Attracted by the scent and colour of the flower, small beetles and thrips are the main floral visitors. they crawl in and lay their eggs within the center of the flower, which contains the flower's pollen. Within the flower some of the sticky pollen gets trapped on the insect's bodies, and if the next flower they visit is a receptive one, it will pollinate and produce the seeds.
While most modern flowering plants produce seeds which have one cotyledon (monocotyledons) or two (dicotyledons), the seedlings of the Ribbonwood have between two and five cotyledons. Also the ribbonwood can produce more than one shoot per seed (usually one per cotyledon). I. australiense is the only known species in which the flowers display a continuous  spiral series of bracts, sepals, petals, stamens and finally staminodes.

Seeds and their dispersal ecology
The seeds are currently mainly spread through gravity dispersal, the seeds rolling down the steep mountain slopes to find their new home. The seeds are so toxic that most animals cannot eat them without being severely poisoned; however it is known that the native musky rat-kangaroo does disperse and bury some of these seeds. It has been suggested that the seeds were formerly dispersed by the now-extinct Diprotodon, on the basis that many Australian marsupials are adapted to cope with the toxins in Australian plants.

The plants have adapted a unique poison, a chemical called idiospermuline contained within the seed, to prevent animals eating them. Researchers discovered the poison affects transmission of messages between individual nerve cells, which may cause seizures. In small doses this chemical can be used to save lives.

Etymology

The name Idiospermum derives from the Ancient Greek idios meaning individuality or peculiarity, and spérma meaning seed, referring to the unique characteristics of the fruits. The common name "idiot fruit" is a mistranslation of this.

Scientific recognition
The first European-Australians to recognise the trees were timber cutters south of Cairns in the late 1800s. It was thought to have become extinct, but was later brought to the attention of the German botanist Ludwig Diels, who in 1902 described the species in the genus Calycanthus as C. australiense, a remarkable disjunction for this otherwise North American genus. It was later believed to be extinct again, because when Diels finally returned to the location where this tree was found, the natural vegetation had been destroyed for a sugar cane farm.

In 1971, John Nicholas, a Daintree grazier, believing someone to be poisoning his cattle, called in the police. A government veterinarian, Doug Clague, discovered in the cows’ stomachs relatively intact Idiospermum seeds that had been swallowed whole. Curious about this seed’s ability to  kill cattle—after first causing spasms and paralysing the nerves—he sent specimens off to botanist Stan Blake at the Queensland Herbarium.

Upon receiving the specimen Blake recognised the outside shell of the fruit as belonging to the same plant which had been previously described by Ludwig Diels as Calycanthus. Blake was eager to undertake a detailed study of the plant and requested that ecologists Len Webb and Geoff Tracey of the CSIRO Rainforest Ecology Research Unit, who were to shortly embark upon a research trip to the region, stop at Cape Tribulation for the purpose of locating a complete intact set of specimens.

Upon arriving in the Daintree area Webb and Tracey stopped at a small watercourse called Oliver Creek, a short distance south of Cape Tribulation, where they were soon able to locate a number of the trees in full flower amidst the riparian forest. They collected samples of the plant including a piece of bark as well as  samples from other trees with which they were unfamiliar. These included a number of species which had not previously been recorded in Australia such as Ryparosa javanica and Gardenia actinocarpa as well the then undescribed Lepiderema hirsuta.

Upon analysis of the bark sample that Webb and Tracey had collected at Oliver Creek, chemists were able to isolate an alkaloid called Calycanthine which initially suggested that Stan Blake was correct in his assumptions about the identity of the plant. Upon closer inspection of the fruit and the flower specimens together, along with details of the size of the tree, it soon became apparent to Blake that the poisonous fruit did not belong to a Calycanthus despite it being a part of the Calycanthaceae family which represents a very primitive line of angiosperms.

Blake determined that the specimen was so different from the rest of the Calycanthaceae family that a new genus called Idiospermum was erected with Idiospermum australiense as the sole species.

References

External links 
 The families of flowering plants: Descriptions, illustrations, identification, information retrieval by L. Watson and M. J. Dallwitz 
 The story of the rediscovery of Idiospermum by Prue Hewett
 An update of the Angiosperm Phylogeny Group classification for the orders and families of flowering plants: APG II by the Angiosperm Phylogeny Group
 The Australian Geographic Story of the Idiot Tree Plant

Flora of Queensland
Laurales of Australia
Monotypic Laurales genera
Calycanthaceae